Dil Kumari Rawal Thapa (Nepali: दिल कुमारी रावल थापा), also known as Parbati Rawal, is a Nepalese communist politician and member of the National Assembly. In 2018 she was elected in Bagmati Province for the Communist Party of Nepal (Unified Marxist–Leninist) with a six-year term. She is the President of the National Concern and Coordination Committee under the National Assembly.

References 

Nepal Communist Party (NCP) politicians
Members of the National Assembly (Nepal)
Communist Party of Nepal (Unified Marxist–Leninist) politicians
Year of birth missing (living people)
Living people